Attila Dragóner (born 15 November 1974 in Budapest) is a Hungarian former footballer.

He was a defender for Ferencvárosi Torna Club in Budapest, Hungary. Dragóner was a key player in defence and counterattacking. He played for Ferencvárosi TC, in his native Hungary. He also played for the Hungarian national football team.

Honours
Ferencvárosi TC
 Nemzeti Bajnokság I: 2001, 2004; Runners-up: 1998, 2002, 2003
 Magyar Kupa: 2003, 2004; Runner-up: 2005
 Szuperkupa: 2004

References

External links
 HLSZ profile 
 

1974 births
Living people
Footballers from Budapest
Hungarian footballers
Hungary international footballers
Footballers at the 1996 Summer Olympics
Olympic footballers of Hungary
Hungarian expatriate footballers
Veszprém LC footballers
Stadler FC footballers
Budapesti VSC footballers
Ferencvárosi TC footballers
SC Fortuna Köln players
Vitória S.C. players
2. Bundesliga players
Expatriate footballers in Germany
Hungarian expatriate sportspeople in Germany
Expatriate footballers in Portugal
Hungarian expatriate sportspeople in Portugal
Association football defenders